Andrew or Andy Welsh may refer to:

Andrew Welsh (politician) (1944–2021), Scottish politician
Andrew Welsh (footballer) (born 1983), Australian rules footballer
Andy Welsh (born 1983), English footballer
Andy Welsh (footballer, born 1917) (1917–1990), English footballer

See also
Andrew Welch (disambiguation)